Parablennius postoculomaculatus, the false Tasmanian blenny, is a species of demersal tropical combtooth blenny. It is native to western Australia.

References

External links
 Fishes of Australia : Parablennius postoculomaculatus

postoculumaculatus
Vertebrates of Western Australia
Marine fish of Western Australia
Taxa named by Hans Bath
Taxa named by J. Barry Hutchins
false Tasmanian blenny